Felix Petrovich Tarasenko (6 March 1932 – 1 January 2021) was a Russian mathematician. He attended Tomsk State University and was one of the founders of the theory of systems analysis.

Distinctions
Jubilee Medal "In Commemoration of the 100th Anniversary of the Birth of Vladimir Ilyich Lenin" (1969)

References

1932 births
2021 deaths
Russian mathematicians
Scientists from Saratov
Tomsk State University alumni